Town Planning Authority Ground is a multi purpose stadium in Dharwar, Karnataka. The ground is mainly used for organizing matches of football, cricket and other sports.  The stadium hosted one first-class match. In 1973, the Karnataka cricket team played against Tamil Nadu, but since then the stadium has not hosted any cricket matches.

References

External links 
 cricketarchive
 cricinfo
 Hubli-Dharwad city profiles

Buildings and structures in Hubli-Dharwad
Cricket grounds in Karnataka
Year of establishment missing